Chrysoprasis nana is a species of beetle in the family Cerambycidae. It was described by Henry Walter Bates in 1870.

References

Chrysoprasis
Beetles described in 1870